was a Japanese domain of the Edo period.  It was associated with Bungo Province in modern-day Ōita Prefecture on the island of Kyushu.

In the han system, Mori was a political and economic abstraction based on periodic cadastral surveys and projected agricultural yields.  In other words, the domain was defined in terms of kokudaka, not land area. This was different from the feudalism of the West.

History
The Kurushima family, which ruled Mori during the Edo period, were the descendants of the Kurushima who formed part of the Murakami pirates of the Inland Sea, during the Sengoku period. Kurushima Nagachika (later called Yasuchika) held 14,000 koku of territory at Kijima in Iyo Province. In 1600, he sided with the western army; however, as his wife's uncle was Fukushima Masanori, Honda Masanobu was able to arrange for a special disposition allowing Nagachika's domain and family to remain unmolested. The family was moved to the Mori region of Bungo Province in 1601, and granted the same 14,000 koku of landholding.

The Kurushima family remained as lords of Mori until the Meiji Restoration. During the Boshin War they supported the Kyoto government, and were assigned to guard the abandoned daikansho at Hita (日田). The domain was abolished in 1871, first becoming Mori Prefecture, before being absorbed into Ōita Prefecture, where it remains today. In 1884, the Mori family became shishaku (子爵, viscounts) in the new kazoku nobility system.

The fairy-tale writer Kurushima Takehiko is a descendant of the Kurushima daimyō family.

List of daimyōs 
The hereditary daimyōs were head of the clan and head of the domain.

Kurushima family, 1601–1871 (tozama; 14,000 → 12,500 koku)

 Kurushima Yasuchika
 Kurushima Michiharu
 Kurushima Michikiyo
 Kurushima Michimasa
 Kurushima Terumichi
 Kurushima Michisuke
 Kurushima Michitomo
 Kurushima Michihiro
 Kurushima Michikata
 Kurushima Michiaki
 Kurushima Michitane
 Kurushima Michiyasu

See also 
 List of Han
 Abolition of the han system

References

External links
 Mori Domain entry on "Edo 300 HTML" (16 Sept. 2007)

Domains of Japan